Dimeatidae is a family of sea squirts belonging to the suborder Phlebobranchia

References

Enterogona
Tunicate families
Monogeneric animal families